Maciej Gębala (born 10 January 1994) is a Polish handball player for SC DHfK Leipzig and the Polish national team.

He competed at the 2016 European Men's Handball Championship and at the 2017 World Men's Handball Championship.

Private life
His younger brother Tomasz Gębala is also a handball player.

References

External links

1994 births
Living people
Sportspeople from Gdynia
Polish male handball players
Handball-Bundesliga players
Expatriate handball players
Polish expatriate sportspeople in Germany
SC Magdeburg players
Wisła Płock (handball) players